The Bahrain national basketball team, represents Bahrain in international basketball competitions and is controlled by the Bahrain Basketball Association.

FIBA Asia Championship

Performance 
 best performance : 10th
 worst performance: 1991 : 15th

Bahrain last played at the FIBA Asia Championship in 1999, where they finished 12th with a 2–5 record and victories over Malaysia and Hong Kong.

Bahrain qualified for the FIBA Asia Championship 2009 in Tianjin, China by finishing fourth at the 2009 Gulf Cup.  However, they withdrew before the tournament, opening up a spot for Chinese Taipei to compete in the tournament.

FIBA Asia Champions Cup
In 2000, Bahrain club Al-Manama finished third in the FIBA Asia Champions Cup, the only time that a Bahrain club medaled at the championship.

Competitions

FIBA Asia Cup

Team

Current roster

2021 FIBA Asia Cup qualification
Opposition: India (21 February)
Venue: Khalifa Sport City, Manama
Opposition: Lebanon (24 February)
Venue: Nouhad Nawfal Sports Complex, Zouk Mikael

Past roster

References

External links
Bahrain Basketball Blogspot
Bahrain Basketball Records at FIBA Archive
Asia-basket - Bahrain Men National Team
Presentation on Facebook
27th FIBA Asia Championships 2013:Bahrain Team Details

Men's national basketball teams
Basketball in Bahrain
National sports teams of Bahrain
1975 establishments in Bahrain
National sports teams established in 1975